Fort William and Mary was a colonial fortification in Britain's worldwide system of defenses, defended by soldiers of the Province of New Hampshire who reported directly to the royal governor. The fort, originally known as "The Castle," was situated on the island of New Castle, New Hampshire, at the mouth of the Piscataqua River estuary. It was renamed Fort William and Mary circa 1692, after the accession of the monarchs William III and Mary II to the British throne. It was captured by Patriot forces, recaptured, and later abandoned by the British in the Revolutionary War. The fort was renamed Fort Constitution in 1808 following rebuilding. The fort was further rebuilt and expanded through 1899 and served actively through World War II.

Colonial period 

First fortified by the British prior to 1632, the fort guarded access to the harbor at Portsmouth and served as the colony's main munitions depot. The fort also served to protect Kittery, Maine, on the opposite shore, which was raided numerous times by the tribes of the Wabanaki Confederacy during the French and Indian Wars. Shadrach Walton commanded the fort during different periods at the end of the 17th and beginning of the 18th century.

American Revolution 

In 1774, it was the only permanently occupied military post in New Hampshire.

1774 Raid 

On December 14, 1774, local Patriots from the Portsmouth area, led by John Langdon, stormed the post (overcoming a six-man caretaker detachment) and seized the garrison's powder, which was distributed through several New Hampshire towns for potential use in the looming struggle against Great Britain. On December 15, 1774, patriots led by John Sullivan again raided the fort, this time seizing numerous cannon.

Fort Constitution 

Following the Revolution, the fort was called Castle Fort or Fort Castle. The state gave Fort Point, on which the fort stood, to the federal government in 1791. In 1800, the Portsmouth Naval Shipyard was established upriver on Fernald's Island (now part of Seavey's Island), and the fort was rebuilt under the Second System of US fortifications. Walls were doubled in height and new brick buildings were added. Work was completed in 1808 and the defense renamed "Fort Constitution". On July 4, 1809, an accidental explosion marred Independence Day celebrations at the fort, killing a number of soldiers and civilians. The Secretary of War's report on fortifications for December 1811 describes Fort Constitution as "an enclosed irregular work of masonry, mounting 36 heavy guns... (with) brick barracks for two companies..." During the War of 1812 the fort was occupied and expanded with Walbach Tower, a Martello tower with a single 32-pounder cannon, being built in 1814.

During the Civil War, Fort Constitution was projected to be rebuilt as a three-tiered granite fort under the Third System of US fortifications.  However, advances in weaponry, particularly armored, steam-powered warships with heavy rifled guns, rendered the masonry design obsolete before it was finished. The fort's construction was abandoned in 1867 with the Second System fort largely intact and two walls from the Third System built around parts of it. At some point in the Civil War era, four 100-pounder (6.4 inch, 163 mm) Parrott rifles were mounted at the fort, and remained there at least through late 1903.

In 1897 construction began on Battery Farnsworth, located under the hill on which the ruins of Walbach Tower stand, as part of the large-scale Endicott Program of seacoast fortifications. It was part of the Coast Defenses of Portsmouth, along with Fort Stark and Fort Foster. The battery was completed in 1899. Named for Brigadier General Elon J. Farnsworth, the installation included two 8-inch (203 mm) M1888 guns on disappearing carriages. The battery was accompanied in 1904 by Battery Hackleman, with two 3-inch (76 mm) M1903 guns on pedestal mounts. A mine casemate for an underwater minefield in the harbor was built; Battery Hackleman was built primarily to defend this minefield against minesweepers.

After the American entry into World War I in early 1917, many guns were removed from coast defenses for potential service on the Western Front.  Both 8-inch guns of Battery Farnsworth were removed for use as railway artillery in October 1917 and were not returned to the fort. In 1920 a mine casemate was built next to Battery Farnsworth to replace a similar facility at Fort Stark.

In World War II Battery Hackleman's 3-inch guns were sent to a new battery of the same name at Fort H. G. Wright on Fisher's Island, New York. They were replaced by two 3-inch (76 mm) M1902 guns from Battery Hays at nearby Fort Stark. In 1940-1944 the Harbor Defenses of Portsmouth were garrisoned by the 22nd Coast Artillery Regiment. Also, a mine observation station was built atop Battery Farnsworth. Battery Hackleman was disarmed by 1948 and the fort was turned over to the Coast Guard. Battery Hackleman was demolished, but Battery Farnsworth can still be seen.

Given back to the state in 1961, Fort Constitution State Park was listed on the National Register of Historic Places in 1973 and is today open to the public.

The lighthouse 

Since 1771 the fort has been home to a lighthouse.  The current installation, the Portsmouth Harbor Light, was completed in 1878.  Its Fourth Order Fresnel lens remains a valuable aid to navigation.  The tower and the grounds immediately around it are open for scheduled tours.

See also

 Seacoast defense in the United States
 United States Army Coast Artillery Corps
 8th Coast Artillery (United States)
 National Register of Historic Places listings in Rockingham County, New Hampshire
 New Hampshire Historical Marker No. 4: William & Mary Raids

References

Bibliography

Further reading

 DeMitchell, Terri A. (2013). The Portsmouth Alarm: December 1774. Mahomet, IL: Mayhaven Publishing, Inc. . (A fictionalized account of the raid on Fort William and Mary written for young adult audiences.)
 Elwin L. Page. "The King's Powder, 1774," New England Quarterly Vol. 18, No. 1 (Mar., 1945), pp. 83–92 in JSTOR
 Thomas F. Kehr, "The Seizure of his Majesty's Fort William and Mary at New Castle, New Hampshire, December 14–15, 1774," Essays and Articles, New Hampshire Society of the Sons of the American Revolution at

External links 
 Fort Constitution Historic Site New Hampshire Department of Natural and Cultural Resources
 Fort Constitution from American Forts Network
 Detailed account of raids
 List of documented participants in raids
 Additional information at the University of New Hampshire
 Portsmouth Harbor Lighthouse History
 List of all US coastal forts and batteries at the Coast Defense Study Group, Inc. website
 FortWiki, lists most CONUS and Canadian forts

William and Mary
William and Mary
William and Mary
Landmarks in New Hampshire
New Hampshire in the American Revolution
William and Mary
1774 in the Thirteen Colonies
Buildings and structures in Rockingham County, New Hampshire
William and Mary
William and Mary
National Register of Historic Places in Rockingham County, New Hampshire
New Castle, New Hampshire
American Revolution on the National Register of Historic Places